Henrik Nilsson may refer to:

Henrik Nilsson (canoeist) (born 1976), Swedish former sprint canoer
Henrik Nilsson (ice hockey, born 1970), Swedish retired ice hockey player
Henrik Nilsson (ice hockey, born 1991), Swedish ice hockey player
Henrik Nilsson (footballer) (born 1972), Swedish former footballer
Henrik Nilsson (rower) (born 1969), Swedish Olympic rower